The 1974 William & Mary Indians football team represented the College of William & Mary as a member of the Southern Conference (SoCon) during the 1974 NCAA Division I football season. Led by Jim Root in his third year as head coach, William & Mary finished the season 4–7 overall and 2–3 in SoCon play to place sixth.

Schedule

References

William and Mary
William & Mary Tribe football seasons
William and Mary Indians football